Giuseppe Anfossi (born 7 March 1935) is the bishop emeritus of the Roman Catholic Diocese of Aosta from 1994 to 2011.

Biography 
He was ordained priest on 1959. He was appointed bishop of Aosta on 30 December 1994. He was consecrated on 22 January 1995 by cardinal Giovanni Saldarini, replacing the previous bishop Ovidio Lari.

As bishop of Aosta he received in the diocese for the traditional summer holidays in Les Combes d'Introd, Gran Paradiso National Park, the popes John Paul II and Benedict XVI. On St Anselm's Day, 2006, he traveled to Canterbury Cathedral in England to dedicate the new altar in St Anselm's tomb at a ceremony attended by the Archbishop of Canterbury and the abbot of Bec.

He resigned on 9 November 2011.

References

External links
 Profile of Mons. Anfossi on Cathopedia
 Official page of diocese of Aosta

1935 births
Living people
Bishops of Aosta
20th-century Italian Roman Catholic bishops
Religious leaders from Bolzano